Tribe is an album by Italian jazz trumpeter and composer Enrico Rava's Quintet recorded in Italy in 2010 and released on the ECM label.

Reception

The Allmusic review by Thom Jurek awarded the album 3½ stars stating "whether things get woolly and rugged or remain spacious and melodic, lyricism itself is still at the core, and in this, according to Rava, is a much greater freedom to explore. Given the lovely sonic evidence on Tribe, his position is difficult to argue with. This is a band that is exciting, fresh, and inventive. How they grow will be fascinating to observe".

Track listing
All compositions by Enrico Rava except as indicated
 "Amnesia" – 4:34   
 "Garbage Can Blues"  3:34   
 "Choctaw" – 5:38   
 "Incognito" – 10:00   
 "Cornettology" – 8:16   
 "F. Express" – 7:32   
 "Tears for Neda" – 6:16   
 "Song Tree" – 3:36   
 "Paris Baguette" – 3:39   
 "Planet Earth" – 3:04   
 "Tribe" – 5:00   
 "Improvisation" (Enric Rava, Gianluca Petrella, Giovanni Guidi, Gabriele Evangelista, Fabrizio Sferra) – 3:37

Personnel
Enrico Rava – trumpet
Gianluca Petrella – trombone
Giovanni Guidi – piano
Gabriele Evangelista – double bass
Fabrizio Sferra – drums
Giacomo Ancillotto – guitar (tracks 2 & 6–8)

References

ECM Records albums
Enrico Rava albums
2011 albums
Albums produced by Manfred Eicher